Anna Karenina is a 1967 Soviet drama film directed by Aleksandr Zarkhi, based on the 1877 novel of the same name by Leo Tolstoy. It was listed to compete at the 1968 Cannes Film Festival, but the festival was cancelled due to the events of May 1968 in France.

Plot summary

Cast
 Tatiana Samoilova as Anna Karenina
 Nikolai Gritsenko as Aleksei Karenin
 Vasily Lanovoy as Aleksei Vronsky
 Yury Yakovlev as Stiva Oblonsky
 Boris Goldayev as Konstantin Lyovin
 Anastasiya Vertinskaya as Kitty Shcherbatskaya
 Iya Savvina as Dolly Oblonskaya
 Maya Plisetskaya as Betsy Tverskaya
 Lidiya Sukharevskaya as Lidiya Ivanovna  
 Yelena Tyapkina as Knyagina Myagkaya  
 Sofia Pilyavskaya as Grafina Vronskaya
 Andrei Tutyshkin as Lawyer  
 Vasili Sakhnovsky as Seryozha (voiced by Klara Rumyanova)
 Anatoly Kubatsky as Camerdiner Matvey
 Yuri Volyntsev as Vronsky's brother-soldier
 Alexander Kaidanovsky as Jules Lando

References

External links
 

1967 films
1967 drama films
Soviet drama films
1960s Russian-language films
Films directed by Aleksandr Zarkhi
Films based on Anna Karenina
Mosfilm films
Romantic epic films